The China Securities Journal (abbreviated as CSJ or ZGZQB), also transliterated as China Securities Post or China Securities News, is a national securities newspaper in China, published by Xinhua News Agency. It is based in Beijing, and has two offices in Shanghai and Shenzhen. It is one of the most important publications in the financial field.

In October 1992, China Securities Journal was published on a trial basis and was officially launched on January 3, 1993. It is designated by the China Securities Regulatory Commission, the China Banking Regulatory Commission and China Insurance Regulatory Commission to disclose information on listed companies, insurance companies and trust companies.  Positioned as an investment adviser, China Securities Journal has a commitment to providing investors with guidance for investment choice. The editorial purpose of the newspaper is to report policies on the national economy, finance and securities, to disseminate information about finance and securities, to analyze the financial and securities market and to spread knowledge of finance and securities, so as to become a trustworthy investment consultant.

China Securities Journal mainly reports the securities market and the financial market, covering general economic trends in China and the world, macroeconomic policies, securities markets and listed companies, the newspaper also gives a systematic coverage to the market of currency, insurance, funds, futures, real estate, foreign exchange and foreign currency, gold markets and postal service cards.

See also
Banking in China
Chinese financial system
Insurance industry in China

Related periodicals
 Securities Times
 Shanghai Securities Journal
 Securities Daily

References

External links
 

 Old official website

1992 establishments in China
Business newspapers published in China
Chinese-language newspapers (Simplified Chinese)
Newspapers published in Beijing
Publications established in 1992
Xinhua News Agency